Prince Royal (Portuguese: Príncipe Real) was the title held by the heir apparent or the heir presumptive to the throne of the Kingdom of Portugal, from 1825 to 1910.

The eldest son of the Prince Royal held the title of Prince of Beira.

History 
The title of Prince Royal (Príncipe Real) was created in 1815, when the prince regent D. João (future King João VI of Portugal) elevated the State of Brazil to the rank of a kingdom within the United Kingdom of Portugal, Brazil and the Algarves. At this moment the old title of Prince of Brazil was extinct.

With the deposition of the Portuguese monarchy, in 1910, and King Manuel II's death in 1932, the title became abeyant.

List of Princes Royal

See also
Prince of Portugal
Prince of Brazil
Prince of Beira
Infante
List of Portuguese monarchs

References

Heirs to the throne
Princes of Portugal
Portuguese monarchy
Princes Royal of Portugal